Mortis may refer to:

 Mortis, a fictional planet in the Star Wars franchise
 Mortis (food), a sweet chicken pâté of Elizabethan times
 Chris Kanyon (1970–2010), American professional wrestler also known as "Mortis"
 Lois London, Marvel Comics character also known as "Mortis"
 Mortis, a playable character in the mobile game Brawl Stars

See also
 Rigor mortis
 Mortise (disambiguation)
 Mortiis, Norwegian band